The Old Days Feeling is a collection of out-of-print, reissued, and unreleased songs by American musician Mirah. Additionally, the album features collaborative work by Phil Elvrum and Calvin Johnson of K Records. Released to a positive reception in 2008, the album received a score of 7/10 by PopMatters.

Production
In the genre of indie rock recorded in a lo-fi style, many tracks are similar in nature to Mirah's debut album, You Think It's Like This But Really It's Like This. Additionally, the album features collaborative work by Phil Elvrum, who had produced Advisory Committee and C'mon Miracle, and Calvin Johnson, who also wrote the liner notes.

It was released on the record label Modern Radio on July 15, 2008.

Reception

The album met a largely positive reception. Pitchfork Media gave it 7.5/10, Tiny Mix Tapes gave it 3.5/5, and PopMatters gave it 7/10.

Track listing
 "Location Temporary" - 1:17
 "Slighted" - 2:09
 "Don't Go" - 2:17
 "Dreamboat" - 1:34
 "Lone Star" - 2:24
 "Take Me Out Riding" - 1:22
 "Heat Gets Hotter" - 1:55
 "Birthday Present" - 1:35
 "The Place" - 2:16
 "Get It?" - 1:38
 "Land Ho!" - 2:53
 "The Sun" - 3:01
 "Don't!" - 2:54
 "Lonesome Sundown" - 3:32

References

External links
MirahMusic.com

Mirah albums
2008 albums